Gergo Nagy (born October 10, 1989) is a Hungarian professional ice hockey forward. He is currently playing with Hungarian club, Ferencvárosi TC who compete in the Erste Liga.

Nagy returned to Alba Volan on July 1, 2015, after two North American seasons within the Chicago Wolves organization of the American Hockey League (AHL).

Nagy competed at the 2009 Men's World Ice Hockey Championships and 2016 Men's World Ice Hockey Championships as a member of the Hungary men's national ice hockey team.

References

External links

1989 births
Living people
Fehérvár AV19 players
Chicago Wolves players
DVTK Jegesmedvék players
Ferencvárosi TC (ice hockey) players
HC Nové Zámky players
Hungarian ice hockey forwards
Kalamazoo Wings (ECHL) players
MAC Budapest players
Quad City Mallards (CHL) players
20th-century Hungarian people
21st-century Hungarian people
Sportspeople from Dunaújváros
Hungarian expatriate sportspeople in Austria
Hungarian expatriate sportspeople in the United States
Hungarian expatriate sportspeople in Slovakia
Hungarian expatriate ice hockey people
Expatriate ice hockey players in Austria
Expatriate ice hockey players in Slovakia
Expatriate ice hockey players in the United States